is a Japanese manga series written and illustrated by Akira Toriyama. It was serialized in Weekly Shōnen Jump from July to October 2013, with the eleven chapters collected into a single volume by Shueisha. It follows Jaco, an extraterrestrial police officer that has come to Earth to protect it from an evil alien attack.

The eleventh chapter reveals that the story is set before the events of Toriyama's Dragon Ball and features some of its characters. Since the series' conclusion, Jaco has become a recurring character in various Dragon Ball media. The first two chapters received a "Vomic" adaptation for the television show Sakiyomi Jum-Bang!. English-language publisher Viz Media serialized Jaco simultaneously in their digital Weekly Shonen Jump as it ran in Japan and released the single volume in North America in 2015.

Plot summary
Jaco, a Galactic Patrolman sent to Earth to protect it from an evil alien attack, crash lands on Earth. He meets the retired scientist Omori who offers to try and fix his spaceship. The next day, government policeman Katayude informs Omori that he does not have the right to live on the island and has to vacate it in one week or be arrested. Jaco learns that Omori has continued his research on time travel in order to save his deceased wife and assistants, but is only able to temporarily speed up how the user experiences time, giving the illusion of stopped time (not actual time travel according to Jaco, which is against intergalactic law). Omori repairs the spaceship, but deduces that it needs a very expensive metal as fuel.

During a trip to the capital for supplies, Jaco saves a young woman from thugs, but also unknowingly attacks the police, becoming a wanted man. The woman, Tights, decides to join Jaco and Omori on the island and buys a small amount of the expensive metal with the money she was given for agreeing to act as a body double for a pop star in an upcoming dangerous rocket launch publicity stunt. Although not enough to make the trip home, it will allow Jaco to call for help. However, he breaks the ship's radio antennae while showing off.

Katayude sees a news report on Jaco's crime in the capital and realizes he saw the suspect on Omori's island. He arrives with a team the next day to arrest Jaco. During the confrontation, the rocket holding Tights malfunctions and starts falling to Earth. After quickly subduing the government police, Jaco and Omori use Omori's incomplete time machine to give themselves enough time to save Tights. In thanks for preventing a catastrophe, Katayude not only promises to keep Jaco's whereabouts secret, but also allows Omori to stay on the island.

On the day the invading evil alien is supposed to land, Jaco does not see the ship land thanks to Tights and so comes to the conclusion that the Earth is saved. However, the alien did in fact land and is taken in by Son Gohan who gives him the name Son Goku. Thinking to use parts of the ship in order to make the money needed for fuel, the trio call over Tights' father who happens to be Dr. Briefs, a scientific genius and richest man in the world. But it is his younger daughter, Bulma, who fixes the antennae and informs everyone that the expensive metal is not the ship's power source but is only used to store energy, while the similar and much cheaper copper would do the same job. Jaco returns home and Omori buys the island with money from Dr. Briefs. Years later, Katayude has moved to the island as well, Tights has become a science fiction writer, Jaco has found a girlfriend and occasionally visits, and Bulma stops by, having just started out on a journey to gather seven wish-granting balls.

Characters

An alien Galactic Patrolman with a strong sense of justice.

A people-hating theoretical physicist that lives alone on the island a former government laboratory was on. Prior to the start of the series, he worked at the secret laboratory trying to invent a time machine. However, it was abandoned after an accident resulted in many deaths, including that of his wife.

A seventeen-year-old girl who befriends Jaco and Omori and aspires to be a science fiction writer. She is the body double that will be sent into space in place of An Azuki. She graduated from university at age sixteen and is Bulma's older sister.

Chief of the Government Sea Police sent to have Omori vacate the island so it can be turned into a resort.

A sixteen-year-old idol being sent into space on the rocket , where she will sing while orbiting the Earth twice.

Production
Jaco the Galactic Patrolman is Akira Toriyama's first serial in 13 years, following Sand Land in 2000. He provided insight on its creation in digital content for Weekly Shōnen Jump'''s Jump Live! mobile app. He revealed that he began planning the manga a year earlier and that it was originally set to be serialized during the release of Dragon Ball Z: Battle of Gods, but working on two hours of sleep a night exhausted him and he fell four months behind.

The author drew everything on a computer, and for the first time created storyboards separate from rough drafts. He first created a storyboard that he sent to his editor for approval. Once approved, he used the storyboard as a base to draw a rough draft, which was then digitally “inked” with adjustments to the image if necessary. Prior to Jaco he would use his storyboard as the rough draft so as to only have to draw a chapter twice instead of three times. His editor finished the lettering and he occasionally had someone else do the series' logo. Additionally, Toriyama stated this would probably be the last manga he will provide the pictures for by himself.

He noted that Jaco the Galactic Patrolman was being simultaneously released overseas and said that while foreign fans were probably expecting an action series like Dragon Ball, Jaco is simple and they might have trouble understanding Japanese elements. Toriyama called the manga a "goofy and fun story of friendship" and named it his favorite story and main character that he has created.

Release
Written and illustrated by Akira Toriyama, Jaco the Galactic Patrolman was serialized in Weekly Shōnen Jump from issue #33 on July 29 to #44 on October 14, 2013 in celebration of the magazine's 45th anniversary. The eleven chapters were collected into one tankōbon and one larger kanzenban that were released on April 4, 2014 by Shueisha. Both versions contain a bonus story focusing on Dragon Ball that unveils Goku's mother, while the kanzenban alone includes a postcard, a key ring and a Galactic Patrol badge. The series was released digitally on July 4, 2014.

Viz Media began serializing Jaco the Galactic Patrolman in English in their digital Weekly Shonen Jump magazine just two days after its debut in Japan. The magazine published the bonus Dragon Ball story in its May 7, 2014 issue. Viz released the collected volume in North America on January 6, 2015.

Chapter list

Other media

In January 2014, the first two chapters of Jaco the Galactic Patrolman received a four-part "Vomic" adaptation for the television show Sakiyomi Jum-Bang!. The segment has voice actors act over a manga series as the pages are shown on screen.

That same year, Jaco and Tights made a cameo appearance in the eleventh chapter of Dragon Ball Heroes: Victory Mission, a Dragon Ball spin-off manga drawn for V Jump by Toyotarou.

A code to download Jaco as a playable character in the 2015 Dragon Ball Xenoverse was included as a pre-order bonus for the Japanese version of the game, and as downloadable content with a monetary fee for international versions. Jaco returns as a playable character in the sequel Dragon Ball Xenoverse 2 and is among the few characters that is playable from the start. Additionally both Jaco and Tights appear in Dragon Ball Fusions, though Tights appears as an NPC while Jaco is an unlockable playable character, though Tights outfit can be unlocked by completing a Sub-Event involving her.

Jaco appears in the 2015 theatrical anime film Dragon Ball Z: Resurrection 'F'. He becomes a recurring character in Dragon Ball Super, where Tights also makes a brief appearance. The story of Dragon Ball Minus was adapted into part of the 2018 film Dragon Ball Super: Broly.

Reception
In its debut week of March 31 – April 6, 2014, Oricon reported that the regular tankōbon volume of Jaco the Galactic Patrolman sold 30,802 copies while the kanzenban edition sold 47,482. The kanzenban sold an additional 31,370 in its second week. A total of 79,985 copies of the regular edition were sold by its fifth week, before the series fell off the Oricon chart.

Rebecca Silverman of Anime News Network gave Jaco the Galactic Patrolman an overall B rating, believing that despite a slow start it gets better as it goes on. While the plot is simple, she believes it provides "interesting commentary" on idol worship in Japanese pop culture. She said that while it is a must-have for Dragon Ball fans, "when one of the masters of shounen manga puts his story in motion" there is something for everyone to enjoy. Otaku USAs Joseph Luster called Jaco'' a light and fun standalone manga with the "special type of humor and joy that only Toriyama can muster." He stated that the series has well-defined characters and well-timed visual gags and wordplay.

References

External links
 Official Jaco the Galactic Patrolman Vomic page
 

Akira Toriyama
Comedy anime and manga
Dragon Ball
Science fiction anime and manga
Shōnen manga
Shueisha manga
Viz Media manga